Frank Taylor (1859 – 2 May 1937) was a New Zealand cricketer. He played two first-class matches for Wellington between 1888 and 1891.

See also
 List of Wellington representative cricketers

References

External links
 

1859 births
1937 deaths
New Zealand cricketers
Wellington cricketers
Cricketers from Kingston upon Hull